The final stages of the 2013 Copa Sudamericana were played from September 18 to December 11, 2013. A total of 16 teams competed in the final stages.

Draw
The draw of the tournament was held on July 3, 2013, 12:00 UTC−3, at the Sheraton Hotel in Buenos Aires, Argentina.

To determine the bracket starting from the round of 16, the defending champion and the 15 winners of the second stage were assigned a "seed" by draw. The defending champion and the winners from Argentina Zone and Brazil Zone were assigned even-numbered "seeds", and the winners from ties between South Zone and North Zone were assigned odd-numbered "seeds".

Seeding
The following were the seeding of the 16 teams which qualified for the final stages, which included the defending champion (São Paulo) and the 15 winners of the second stage (three from Argentina Zone, four from Brazil Zone, eight from ties between South Zone and North Zone):

Format
In the final stages, the 16 teams played a single-elimination tournament, with the following rules:
Each tie was played on a home-and-away two-legged basis, with the higher-seeded team hosting the second leg.
In the round of 16, quarterfinals, and semifinals, if tied on aggregate, the away goals rule was used. If still tied, the penalty shoot-out was used to determine the winner (no extra time was played).
In the finals, if tied on aggregate, the away goals rule was not used, and 30 minutes of extra time was played. If still tied after extra time, the penalty shoot-out was used to determine the winner.
If there were two semifinalists from the same association, they must play each other.

Bracket
The bracket of the knockout stages was determined by the seeding as follows:
Round of 16:
Match A: Seed 1 vs. Seed 16
Match B: Seed 2 vs. Seed 15
Match C: Seed 3 vs. Seed 14
Match D: Seed 4 vs. Seed 13
Match E: Seed 5 vs. Seed 12
Match F: Seed 6 vs. Seed 11
Match G: Seed 7 vs. Seed 10
Match H: Seed 8 vs. Seed 9
Quarterfinals:
Match S1: Winner A vs. Winner H
Match S2: Winner B vs. Winner G
Match S3: Winner C vs. Winner F
Match S4: Winner D vs. Winner E
Semifinals: (if there were two semifinalists from the same association, they must play each other)
Match F1: Winner S1 vs. Winner S4
Match F2: Winner S2 vs. Winner S3
Finals: Winner F1 vs. Winner F2

Note: The bracket was changed according to the rules of the tournament so that the two semifinalists from Brazil would play each other.

Round of 16
The first legs were played on September 18–19 and 24–26, and the second legs were played on September 25–26, October 2 and 22–24, 2013.

|}

Match A

São Paulo won 5–4 on aggregate.

Match B

River Plate won 3–2 on aggregate.

Match C

Ponte Preta won 2–1 on aggregate.

Match D

Libertad won 4–1 on aggregate.

Match E

Itagüí won 3–1 on aggregate.

Match F

Vélez Sarsfield won 4–2 on aggregate.

Match G

Lanús won 4–1 on aggregate.

Match H

Tied 1–1 on aggregate, Atlético Nacional won on penalties.

Quarterfinals
The first legs were played on October 29–31, and the second legs were played on November 6–7, 2013.

|}

Match S1

São Paulo won 3–2 on aggregate.

Match S2

Lanús won 3–1 on aggregate.

Match S3

Ponte Preta won 2–0 on aggregate.

Match S4

Libertad won 2–1 on aggregate.

Semifinals
The first legs were played on November 20–21, and the second legs were played on November 27–28, 2013.

A minute of silence was held in honor to the passing of two-time World Cup-winning Brazilian player Nílton Santos at both second leg games of the semifinals.

|}

Match F1

Ponte Preta won 4–2 on aggregate.

Match F2

Lanús won 4–2 on aggregate.

Finals

The finals were played on a home-and-away two-legged basis, with the higher-seeded team hosting the second leg. If tied on aggregate, the away goals rule was not used, and 30 minutes of extra time was played. If still tied after extra time, the penalty shoot-out was used to determine the winner.

The first leg was played on December 4, and the second leg was played on December 11, 2013.

Lanús won 3–1 on aggregate.

References

External links
 
Copa Sudamericana, CONMEBOL.com 

2